USCAP may refer to several things:
United States and Canadian Academy of Pathology
U.S. Climate Action Partnership